The 2007 French Road Cycling Cup was the 16th edition of the French Road Cycling Cup. It started on February 25 with the Tour du Haut Var and finished on October 11 with Paris–Bourges. Sébastien Chavanel of La Française des Jeux won the overall competition.

Events

External links
  Coupe de France Standings

French Road Cycling Cup
French Road Cycling Cup
Road cycling